The 2010 World Interuniversity Games were the 12th edition of the Games (organised by IFIUS, and took place in Valencia, Spain.

Venues
 Mestalla Stadium - Opening and closing ceremonies, athletics, football

Hosting
After 8 years, the Games were again held in Spain.

The Universidad CEU Cardenal Herrera were the host university.

References

2010 in multi-sport events
2010 in Spanish sport
2010
International sports competitions hosted by Spain
Multi-sport events in Spain
Sports competitions in Valencia
October 2010 sports events in Europe